Rags and Silk (German: Lumpen und Seide) is a 1925 German silent comedy film directed by Richard Oswald and starring Reinhold Schünzel, Mary Parker and Johannes Riemann.

The film's sets were designed by the art director Kurt Richter.

Cast
 Reinhold Schünzel Max 
 Mary Parker as Irene 
 Johannes Riemann as Erik, Irenes Mann 
 Einar Hanson as Werner, Eriks Bruder 
 Maly Delschaft as Ulrike, Gesellschafterin 
 Mary Kid as Hilde, ein Mädchen aus dem Volke 
 Ferdinand Bonn as Hildes Vater

References

Bibliography
 Grange, William. Cultural Chronicle of the Weimar Republic. Scarecrow Press, 2008.

External links

1925 films
1926 comedy films
1926 films
German comedy films
Films of the Weimar Republic
Films directed by Richard Oswald
German silent feature films
German black-and-white films
1925 comedy films
Silent comedy films
1920s German films